The Soviet assault on Maoka (Maoka Landing) was carried out at the port of Maoka (now Kholmsk), Southern Sakhalin during August 19-22, 1945, by the forces of the Soviet Northern Pacific Flotilla of the Pacific Fleet during the South Sakhalin Offensive of the Soviet–Japanese War at the end of World War II.

Assault
Japanese forces in the port and the city had two battalions of infantry, artillery and mortar units, and coast guard. All of them were subordinate to the commander of the 88th Infantry Division of the Fifth Area Army.

After a Soviet submarine and aviation reconnaissance on August 17, on August 19 an amphibious force of the 113th Rifle Brigade and a battalion of marines of total force of 3,400 moved out from Sovetskaya Gavan and landed at Maoka early morning on August 20. Due to heavy fog, there was no aviation support, and instead the city was subject to heavy artillery bombardment from ships. Due to initial surprise, the coastal facilities were quickly occupied, but later the Soviet troops, according to the Soviet sources, were met with fierce Japanese resistance. However the Japanese side states that their military tried to avoid engagement keeping defensive positions, busy with evacuation of equipment (described as "looting the city" in some Soviet sources ) and guiding the evacuation of about 18,000 civilians.

After the success of the assault, during August 22-24 Soviet reinforcements arrived from Vladivostok and proceeded to clear the Japanese forces from South Sakhalin.<ref name=dagla> David Glantz, The Soviet Strategic Offensive in Manchuria, 1945: 'August Storm''', p 293</ref> According to refugees already evacuated from the area, Soviet forces carried out fierce naval bombardment and artillery strikes against Japanese installations in Maoka, Shikuka and civilians who were awaiting evacuation. Nearly 1,000 civilians were killed in this attack. Witnesses reported that to a high level of fatalities among civilians were caused by the confusion of European-style kokumin-fuku, men's approved civil attire, with military uniforms.

A number of telephone operators of the city post office pledged not to evacuate and maintained contact with the city of Wakkanai on Hokkaido, as well as mainland Japan, until the moment that Soviet forces destroyed the telephone and postal installations in the city. On August 20, fearing that they would be raped by the invading Soviet troops, nine of the twelve female operators poisoned themselves. Three were saved by male colleagues' intervention. The survivors at the post office were treated well by the Soviets. The city of Wakkanai has a memorial to these post office operators.

On August 21 the weather permitted the operation of aviation, nevertheless the Japanese continued the resistance following the order to cover the evacuation.

In popular culture
 Karafuto 1945 Summer Hyosetsu no Mon Kiri no Hi''

References

Pacific theatre of World War II
Battles of World War II involving Japan
Battles involving the Soviet Union
Japan–Soviet Union relations
Karafuto
1945 in Japan
1945 in the Soviet Union
Conflicts in 1945
Mass murder in 1945
August 1945 events in Asia